The International (styled as The INTERNATIONAL) was a professional golf tournament in Colorado on the PGA Tour. It was played for 21 seasons, from 1986 through 2006, at the Castle Pines Golf Club at Castle Pines Village in Castle Rock, south of Denver.

It had the distinction of being one of two PGA Tour events not conducted at traditional stroke play, the only other exception is the match-play event, the WGC-Accenture Match Play Championship.

Beginning in 2007, the International was scheduled to change dates to be played during the first full weekend of July (July 5–8, and July 4–7, 2008), midway between the U.S. Open and the British Open. Tournament officials hoped this new date would draw even more top-ranked players, such as Tiger Woods, as it would no longer be contested the week before (or after) the year's final major (PGA Championship). Even with the change in dates, both tournament founder Jack Vickers and the membership of the club were apparently not happy with the overall direction the PGA Tour was taking.

On February 8, 2007, the PGA Tour announced the permanent cancellation of the International. It was replaced by the AT&T National, hosted by the Tiger Woods Foundation, and held in the Washington, D.C. area; near sea level, it uses standard stroke play.

The Modified Stableford scoring system returned to the PGA Tour in 2012 at the Reno–Tahoe Open, also at high elevation.

Format
The Modified Stableford system awards points on each hole, based on the score relative to par. It is designed to reward aggressive play, taking chances to go for birdies (or better), as the reward for a low score on a hole is typically greater than the punishment for a poor score. For example, over a two-hole span, a birdie (+2) and a bogey (−1) gain one point, where two pars gain nothing. The scoring operates as follows:

Holes in one are treated as the score relative to par; an ace on a par-3 hole would be considered an eagle and scored as +5.

The International used several different formats throughout its history. Until 1993, final-round scores alone determined the winner; additionally, the event had multiple cuts in every year except 2005.
1986: Field cut to 78 after first round; cut to 39 after second round based solely on second-round scores; cut to 12 after third round based solely on third-round scores; winner determined solely by final-round score
1987–1988: Field cut to 78 after first round; cut to 54 after second round based solely on second-round scores; cut to 18 after third round based solely on third-round scores; winner determined solely by final-round score
1989: Field cut to 72 after second round based on two-round cumulative scores; cut to 24 after third round based solely on third-round scores; winner determined solely by final-round score
1990–1992: Field cut to 72 after second round based on two-round cumulative scores; cut to 24 after third round based on three-round cumulative scores; winner determined solely by final-round score
1993–1997: Field cut to 72 after second round based on two-round cumulative scores; cut to 24 after third round based on three-round cumulative scores; winner determined by four-round cumulative score
1998–2004, 2006: Field cut to top 70 and ties after second round based on two-round cumulative scores; cut to top 35 and ties after third round based on three-round cumulative scores; winner determined by four-round cumulative score
2005: Due to rain, schedule changed; no play Thursday; field cut to top 60 and ties after second round based on two-round cumulative scores; 36 holes played on Sunday, with winner determined by four-round cumulative score

Winners

Notes

References

External links
Official tournament website
Coverage on the PGA Tour's official site

Former PGA Tour events
Golf in Colorado
Sports competitions in Denver
Castle Rock, Colorado
Recurring sporting events established in 1986
Recurring sporting events disestablished in 2006
1986 establishments in Colorado
2006 disestablishments in Colorado